Roda Viva is a Brazilian talk show produced and broadcast by TV Cultura since 29 September 1986, traditionally on Monday nights, currently airing at 10 PM (BST). Several political leaders, writers, philosophers, artists, and notable people were interviewed in the show.

Roda Viva features a host presenter, who serves as a mediator, and several journalists from news outlets. In the program the guest sits on a swivel chair in the middle of a circle of journalists, who are in a higher position. The interviewed person turns to answer the journalist asking the question. The studio is surrounded by cameras, so the guest is always facing at least one of them. The mood of the show is of an informal conversation.

Among the people interviewed in Roda Viva were István Mészáros, Marina Silva, Enéas Carneiro, Luís Carlos Prestes, Fernando Henrique Cardoso, José Sarney, Fernando Collor, Fidel Castro, Itamar Franco, Ciro Gomes, Roberto Campos, Eduardo Campos, José Saramago, Tom Jobim, Leonel Brizola, Luiz Inácio Lula da Silva, Dilma Rousseff, Newton Cruz, Cabo Anselmo, Jimmy Wales, Hugo Chávez, Noam Chomsky, Yuval Noah Harari, and Mario Vargas Llosa.

Hosts

Awards and nominations

References

External links 
 Official website
 Memória Roda Viva (episode archive)

Brazilian television talk shows
1986 Brazilian television series debuts
Portuguese-language television shows